International Communist Party (in Spanish: Partido Comunista Internacional) is a small communist group in the Dominican Republic. Its president is Wilson del Obre. It has an office in connection with del Obre's family residence on the Engombe highway, Herrera, Santo Domingo.

References

Listin Diario
Diario Libre

Communist parties in the Dominican Republic
Political parties in the Dominican Republic
Political parties with year of establishment missing